Fabien Canal (born 4 April 1989) is a French former cyclist, who competed in the cyclo-cross, mountain biking, and road cycling disciplines.

Major results

Mountain biking

2007
 1st  Cross-country, National Junior Mountain Bike Championships
2011
 1st  Team relay, UCI Mountain Bike & Trials World Championships (with Maxime Marotte, Victor Koretzky and Julie Bresset)
 1st  Mixed relay, UEC European Mountain Bike Championships (with Maxime Marotte, Victor Koretzky and Julie Bresset)
 1st  Cross-country, National Under-23 Mountain Bike Championships
2014
 1st  Cross-country, National Military Mountain Bike Championships

Cyclo-cross

2013–2014
 1st Cyclo-cross Épenoy
 1st Cyclo-cross Saint-Nabord
 1st Cyclo-cross Saint-Bernard
 1st Cyclo-cross Hauteville-lès-Dijon
 1st Cyclo-cross Golbey
 1st Cyclo-cross Rioz
 1st Cyclo-cross Écuelles
 2nd National Cyclo-cross Championships
2014–2015
 1st Cyclo-cross International de la Solidarité, Lutterbach
 1st Cyclo-cross Les Fins
 1st Cyclo-cross Damelevières

Road

2014
 10th Overall Tour des Pays de Savoie
2015
 5th Overall Tour de Picardie
 7th Tro-Bro Léon
 8th Paris–Chauny
2017
 1st Paris–Mantes-en-Yvelines

References

External links

1989 births
Living people
French male cyclists
French mountain bikers
Cyclo-cross cyclists